Devilfish or devil fish may refer to:

Marine creatures 
 Devil fish (Mobula mobular),  a species of eagle ray
 Devilfish, a name given to the manta ray (Manta birostris)
 Devilfish, the venomous fish Inimicus didactylus
 Devilfish, an alternative and possibly obsolete name for the octopus
 Gray whales (Eschrichtius robustus), called devil fish because of their self-defensive behavior when hunted
 Devil fish, two Australian fishes:
 Paraplesiops meleagris (southern or western blue devil fish)
 Paraplesiops bleekeri (eastern blue devil fish)
 Devil Fish, purported Jenny Haniver cryptids
 Devil Fish, octopus-like, carnivorous cryptid, supposedly seen and killed by Czech adventurer Jan Eskymo Welzl in 1906
 Devil fish, deep-sea fishes in the family Ceratiidae, usually colloquially referred to as "sea devils"
 Devil fish, the deep-sea fish known as the black seadevil
 Devil fish, the Humboldt squid, also known as the "red devil" or "diablo rojo"

Freshwater creatures 
 Devilfish, the northern pike (Esox lucius)

Other 
 Devil Fish (video game), a maze arcade game
 Devilfish (custom car), winner of the 1973 Ridler
 USS Devilfish (SS-292), a Balao-class submarine
 Devilfish, the name of the primary troop transport for the Tau Empire in the fictional universe of Warhammer 40,000
 A set of modifications to the Roland TB-303 Bass Line synthesizer
 The Terminus typeB303 "Devilfish", a 2005 mecha in the anime series Eureka Seven
 Devilfish,  the US video-release title given to the 1984 Italian film Monster Shark
 Devilfish, the online persona of the webcomic character Marcy Wisniewski from PvP
 Devilfish, the nickname of poker player Dave Ulliott

See also 
 Sea devil (disambiguation)